Hugh Latimer Burleson (April 25, 1865 - August 1, 1933) was bishop of the Diocese of South Dakota in the Episcopal Church in the United States from 1916 to 1931.

Early life and education
Burleson was born on April 25, 1865, in Northfield, Minnesota, the son of the Reverend Solomon Stevens Burleson, who was also a lawyer, and 
Abigail Pomeroy. He received his preliminary education at the Racine Grammar School, before studying at Racine College and graduating with a Bachelor of Arts in 1887 and a Master of Arts in 1889. While attending college he operated a printing press in Racine in association with his brothers, and after graduation in 1887 taught at Kemper Hall in Davenport, Iowa. Later, he also graduated from the General Theological Seminary in New York City with a Bachelor of Divinity in 1893.

Ordained ministry
Burleson was ordained deacon by Bishop Charles Chapman Grafton of Fond du Lac on June 24, 1893, and priest in 1894 by Bishop William Paret of Maryland. He served as curate at the Church of the Holy Communion in New York City from 1893 to 1894, and then as rector of St. Mark's Church in Waupaca, Wisconsin from 1894 to 1898. From 1898 to 1900 he was assistant at St. Luke's Church in Rochester, New York, while in 1900 he was elected dean of Gethsemane Cathedral in Fargo, North Dakota. While in Fargo, he started the North Dakota Sheaf, the first church publication in North Dakota, and was active in both York Rite and Scottish Rite Masonry. From 1909 to 1916, Burleson was editorial secretary of the Episcopal Board of Missions and editor of the Spirit of Missions in New York City.

Bishop
On October 25, 1916, Burleson was elected Missionary Bishop of South Dakota, and was consecrated on December 14, 1916, by Presiding Bishop Daniel S. Tuttle. He retained the bishopric until his resignation on September 28, 1931, to serve as the assistant of the presiding bishop. He died on August 1, 1933, in Custer, South Dakota.

References 

1865 births
1933 deaths
People from Northfield, Minnesota
Racine College alumni
General Theological Seminary alumni
Episcopal bishops of South Dakota